The 2007 killing of French tourists in Mauritania happened on 24 December 2007. The attack happened near Aleg, 250 km east of the capital Nouakchott.

The victims, five French tourists on holiday, were attacked while they were having a picnic. Four of them were killed and the fifth was seriously injured. There was one survivor; the victims were his two adult sons, brother, and a friend. The 2008 Dakar Rally was moved to central Europe (known as the 2008 Central Europe Rally when held in April) because of this incident due to concerns of a possible terrorist attack.

Mauritanian authorities arrested nine people on 7 January 2008. An assault rifle was recovered by police from a location close to the scene of the killings. The Mauritanian interior minister blamed a terrorist sleeper cell for the killings. Authorities say suspects are members of an extremist group linked to al-Qaida.

One of the suspects arrested in January, Sidi Ould Sidna, escaped from the police in March but was arrested again in April. Sidna had trained with the group Al-Qaeda in the Maghreb, which confirmed Sidna was affiliated with their organization. In 2010, three men who claimed to be "soldiers of Al-Qaeda", Sidi Ould Sidna, Mohamed Ould Chabarnou, and Maarouf Ould Haiba, were sentenced to death by a Mauritanian court for the attack. Since Mauritania has not used the death penalty since the 1980s, their death sentence will likely be commuted to an extended prison sentence on appeal.

References

Mass murder in 2007
Terrorism deaths in Mauritania
2007 crimes in Mauritania
Tourism in Mauritania
Terrorist incidents in Africa in 2007
Deaths by firearm in Mauritania
Terrorist incidents attributed to al-Qaeda in the Islamic Maghreb
French terrorism victims
December 2007 events in Africa
Attacks on tourists
Terrorist incidents in Mauritania